Kong Xuanyou (born July 1959), is a Chinese diplomat and the Ambassador to Japan from 2019 to 2023. He is responsible of Asian affairs, treaty and law, land and sea boundaries and other affairs related to consulates.

Life 
Kong was born to an ethnic Korean family in Heilongjiang province in 1959. Between 1979 and 1983, he studied Arabic and Japanese languages at Shanghai International Studies University. Between 1983 and 1985 he studied foreign relations at China Foreign Affairs University. His first diplomatic post was in the Chinese consulate of Osaka as a clerk (1985–1989). In 2006, he was appointed the envoy of the embassy of China in Japan. Between 2011 and 2014, he was the ambassador of China in Vietnam. After working briefly as the deputy of Asian affairs, he was appointed the assistant minister of the ministry of foreign affairs in 2015.  In August 2017, Gong succeeded Wu Dawei as the chief representative of China in Six-party talks. He assumed the Deputy Minister of Foreign Affairs position in January 2018 until he was appointed as Ambassador to Japan.

During his years in Japan, Kong worked together with the current Chinese ambassador to the US Cui Tiankai and Minister of Foreign affair Wang Yi. The three are said to be close friends.

According to South Korean media JoongAng Ilbo, when meeting with delegations of Korean parliamentarians, Kong expressed his regret on Korea's decision of deploying THAAD, but did not wish the Sino-Korean relationship to worsen because of that.

Kong is married and has one daughter.

References 

1959 births
Living people
Ambassadors of China to Vietnam
Chinese people of Korean descent
Recipients of Hilal-i-Quaid-i-Azam
People's Republic of China politicians from Heilongjiang
Shanghai International Studies University alumni
China Foreign Affairs University alumni